List of companies in Burnaby includes companies that are/were headquartered or based their operations in Burnaby, British Columbia, Canada.

B
 Ballard Power Systems
 Best Buy Canada
 Blue Castle Games

C
 Canada Wide Media
 Cityfone
 Creo

D
 D-Wave Systems

E
 EA Canada

F
 Freshslice Pizza
 Future Shop (merged with Best Buy)

G
 Glentel
 Global News: BC 1

I
 Inex Pharmaceuticals
 Ironclad Games

K
 Knowledge Network

O
 Ossian Studios

P
 Pacific Blue Cross
 PMC-Sierra
 Petro-Canada